The 2011 UCLA Bruins football team represented the University of California, Los Angeles in the 2011 NCAA Division I FBS football season. The team was coached during the regular season by fourth year head coach Rick Neuheisel and played their home games at the Rose Bowl in Pasadena, California. Mike Johnson was named the interim head coach for the Kraft Fight Hunger Bowl after Neuheisel was fired.

On November 25, 2011, with Colorado's defeat of Utah, the Bruins were declared the South Division champions.  On November 28, 2011, UCLA announced that it had fired Neuheisel but would allow him to coach his final game in the first Pac-12 Football Championship Game on December 2, 2011.  The Bruins were then defeated 49–31 in that game by Oregon at Autzen Stadium. The season concluded with a loss to Illinois, 20–14, in the Kraft Fight Hunger Bowl and completed a 6–8 overall record (5–4 in the Pac-12).  With the loss to Illinois, UCLA became the first bowl-eligible team to ever lose eight games.

The radio broadcast team members on flagship station KLAC-AM 570 were Chris Roberts, play-by-play; Matt Stevens, analyst; and Wayne Cook, sidelines.

Schedule

Key players
 Anthony Barr (No. 2), So., FB
 Richard Brehaut (No. 12), Jr., QB
 Derrick Coleman (No. 33) Sr., TB
 Tony Dye (No. 6), Sr., FS (Co-Captain)
 Taylor Embree (No. 82), Sr., WR
 Johnathan Franklin (No. 23), Jr., RB (Co-Captain)
 Dalton Hillard (No. 19), Jr., SS
 Datone Jones (No. 56), Jr. (R), DE
 Patrick Larimore (No. 42), Jr., LB (Co-Captain)
 Jeff Locke (No. 18), Jr., P
 Kevin Prince (No. 4), Jr., QB
 Dietrich Riley (No. 1), So., SS
 Kip Smith (No. 17) Fr. (R), PK
 Sean Westgate (No. 11), Jr. (R), LB
 Jordan James (No. 6), Fr. RB
 Nelson Rosario (No. 83) Sr. WR
 Jerry Rice Jr. (No. 88) Fr. WR

Recruitment

UCLA's recruits:

Game summaries

Houston

At game time, UCLA led the series with Houston 3–2, which started on September 17, 1977, in the Astrodome. Last year, the Bruins defeated the Cougars 31–13 in the Rose Bowl.

1st Quarter scoring: HOU – Michael Hayes 1-yard run (Matt Hogan kick); HOU – Hogan 35-yard field goal

2nd Quarter scoring: UCLA – Johnathan Franklin 18-yard run (Kip Smith kick); HOU – Bryce Beall, 12-yard run (Hogan kick); UCLA – Joseph Fauria 5-yard pass from Richard Brehaut (Smith kick); HOU – Hayes 34-yard run (Hogan kick); HOU – Tyron Carrier 23-yard pass from Case Keenum (Hogan kick)

3rd Quarter scoring: UCLA – Derrick Coleman 1-yard run (Smith kick); UCLA – Brehaut 1-yard run (Smith kick)

4th Quarter scoring: HOU – Chris Thompson 0-yard fumble recovery (Hogan kick); UCLA – Anthony Barr 11-yard pass from Brehaut (Smith kick blocked)

San Jose State

The two teams met for the first time in football.

The Spartans' Brandon Rutley provided the highlight of the game with a 65-yard run in the third quarter to tie the score, 17–17. But the Bruins scored a field goal and a Derrick Coleman touchdown in the fourth quarter to come out with their first victory for the 2011 season, their sixth of the last seven home opener victories.

1st Quarter scoring: UCLA – Johnathan Franklin 1-yard run (Kip Smith kick).

2nd Quarter scoring: SJSU – David Freeman 1-yard run (Harrison Waid kick); UCLA – Johseph Fauria 14-yard pass from Richard Brehaut (Smith kick).

3rd Quarter scoring: SJSU – Waid 25-yard field goal; UCLA – Smith 38-yard field goal; SJSU – Brandon Rutley 65-yard run (Waid kick).

4th Quarter scoring: UCLA – Smith 20-yard field goal; UCLA – Derrick Coleman 24-yard run (Smith kick).

Texas

The two teams are meeting for the sixth time, with the Bruins holding a 3–2 edge. The Longhorns are going back to the Rose Bowl for the fourth time in eight years, including a win in the 2005 Rose Bowl against Michigan, a win in the 2006 Rose Bowl against USC for the 2005 National Championship and a loss in the 2009 BCS National Championship Game against Alabama.

1st Quarter scoring: UT – D. J. Grant 45-yard pass from Case McCoy (Justin Tucker kick); UT – Fozz Whittaker 8-yard run (Tucker kick).

2nd Quarter scoring: UT – Malcolm Brown 16-yard run (Tucker kick); UCLA – Derrick Coleman 1-yard run (Jeff Locke kick); UT –  Grant 2-yard pass from McCoy (Tucker kick);  UCLA  – Locke 51-yard field goal.
 
3rd Quarter scoring: UCLA  – Locke 49-yard field goal; UT  – Grant 5-yard pass from Jaxon Shipley (Tucker kick); UCLA – Coleman 1-yard run (Locke kick); UT – Whittaker 36-yard run (Tucker kick)
 
4th Quarter scoring: UT – Cody Johnson 7-yard run (Tucker kick)

Oregon State

UCLA leads the series 40–15–4 that began in 1930 and played in Los Angeles, Corvallis, Portland and Tokyo (1980 Mirage Bowl). The Bruins won last year 17–14 on Kai Forbath's 51-yard field goal on the last play of the game.
 
First Quarter scoring: OSU – Trevor Romaine 25-yard field goal; UCLA – Taylor Embree 22-yard pass from Richard Brehaut (Jeff Locke kick)

Second Quarter scoring: UCLA – Brehaut 5-yard run (Locke kick); UCLA – Jordon James 4-yard run (Locke kick); OSU – Jordan Poyer 85-yard punt return (Romaine kick)

Third Quarter scoring: OSU – Romaine 30-yard field goal; OSU – Jordan Bishop 45-yard pass from Sean Mannion (Two-point pass conversion failed)

Fourth Quarter scoring: UCLA – Anthony Barr 1-yard run (PAT blocked)

Stanford

UCLA leads Stanford 45–33–3 in a series that dates back to 1925. For games played at Stanford, both teams have the same 19–19–2 record.

First Quarter scoring: STAN – Coby Fleener 18-yard pass from Andrew Luck (Jordan Williamson kick)
 
Second Quarter scoring: 	STAN – Stepfan Taylor 2-yard run (Williamson kick); STAN – Williamson 23-yard field goal; UCLA – Joseph Fauria 12-yard pass from Richard Brehaut (Jeff Locke kick) 
 
Third Quarter scoring: 	STAN – Fleener 51-yard pass from Luck (Williamson kick); UCLA – Fauria 13-yard pass from Brehaut (Locke kick failed); STAN – Tyler Gaffney 16-yard run (Williamson kick)
 
Fourth Quarter scoring: 	UCLA – Josh Smith 7-yard run (Locke kick failed); STAN – Taylor 1-yard run (Williamson kick); STAN – Chris Owusu 5-yard pass from Luck (Williamson kick)

Washington State

UCLA leads Washington State 38–18–1 in this series started in 1928. At the Rose Bowl, the Bruins are 8–5 on the Cougars.

First Quarter scoring: WSU – Andrew Furney 21-yard field goal

Second Quarter scoring: WSU – Furney 26-yard field goal; UCLA – Derrick Coleman 1-yard run (Tyler Gonzalez Kick); WSU – Furney 21-yard field goal
 
Third Quarter scoring: UCLA – Coleman 1-yard run (Gonzalez Kick); WSU – Jared Karstetter 8-yard pass from Marshall Lobbestael (Furney kick)

Fourth Quarter scoring: WSU – Rickey Galvin 21-yard pass from Lobbestael (PAT blocked); UCLA – Josh Smith 9-yard pass from Kevin Prince (Two-point conversion failed); WSU – Furney 47-yard field goal; UCLA – Shaquelle Evans 7-yard pass from Prince (Prince pass to Nelson Rosario two-point conversion)

Arizona

Since 1927, UCLA is ahead of Arizona 19–14–2 in this series. The Wildcats have a 10–8 advantage in games played in Tucson, including the last three wins in the Desert. Before halftime, a streaker dressed as a referee and ran off the field, and a fight ensued, leading to two players being ejected, and six Bruins players being suspended.

California

Homecoming.

First Quarter scoring: CAL – Isi Sofele 1-yard run (Giorgio Tavecchio kick)

Second Quarter scoring: UCLA – Johnathan Franklin 11-yard run (Tyler Gonzalez kick); UCLA – Gonzalez 32-yard; UCLA – Derrick Coleman 2-yard run (Gonzalez kick)

Third Quarter scoring: CAL – C.J. Anderson 1-yard run (Tavecchio kick)

Fourth Quarter scoring: UCLA – Coleman 20-yard run (Gonzalez kick); UCLA – Coleman 24-yard run (Gonzalez kick)

Arizona State

First quarter scoring: UCLA – Johnathan Franklin 11-yard run (Tyler Gonzalez kick failed); ASU – A.J. Pickens 35-yard pass from Brock Osweiler (Alex Garoutte kick)
 
Second quarter scoring: 	ASU – C. Marshall 14-yard run (Garoutte kick); UCLA – Gonzalez 43-yard field goal; UCLA – Derrick Coleman 1-yard run (Gonzalez kick)

Third quarter scoring: UCLA – Nelson Rosario 76-yard pass from Kevin Prince (Gonzalez kick); ASU – Jamal Miles, 9-yard pass from Brock Osweiler (Garoutte kick)

Fourth quarter scoring: ASU – Osweiler 1-yard run (Garoutte kick); UCLA – Coleman 1-yard run (Prince pass failed)

Utah

First Quarter scoring: UCLA – Tyler Gonzalez 30-yard field goal
 
Second Quarter scoring: UTAH – John White 1-yard run (Colem Petersen kick)  
 
Third Quarter scoring: UTAH – White 13-yard pass from Jon Hays (Petersen kick); UTAH – White 22-yard run (Petersen kick)
 
Fourth Quarter scoring: UCLA – Gonzalez 35-yard field goal; UTAH – Conroy Black 67-yard interception return (Petersen kick); UTAH – Petersen 38-yard field goal

Colorado

First Quarter scoring: UCLA – Shaqell Evans 54-yard pass from Kevin Prince (Tyler Gonzalez kick); UCLA – Johnathan Franklin 14-yard run (Gonzalez kick); UCLA – Joseph Fauria 5-yard pass from Prince (Gonzalez kick) 
 
Second Quarter scoring: CU – Toney Clemons 20-yard pass from Tyler Hansen ( Will Oliver kick failed)

Third Quarter scoring: UCLA – Gonzalez 22-yard field goal

Fourth Quarter scoring: UCLA – Fauria 15-yard pass from Prince (Gonzalez kick); UCLA – Nelson Rosario 11-yard pass from Prince (Gonzalez kick); UCLA – Malcolm Jones 1-yard run (Gonzalez kick)

USC
Although UCLA and USC had worked out an arrangement to allow each team to wear home uniforms for the rivalry game, in 2011 UCLA debuted an all-white uniform for this game.

First Quarter scoring: USC – Marqise Lee 42-yard pass from Matt Barkley (Andre Heidari kick); USC – Curtis McNeal 73-yard run (Heidari kick)
 
Second Quarter scoring: USC – Randall Telfer 1-yard pass from Barkley (Xavier Grimble pass from Barkley); USC – Rhett Ellison 3-yard pass from Barkley (Heidari kick)

Third Quarter scoring: USC – Marqise Lee 52-yard pass from Barkley (Heidari kick); USC – Robert Woods 4-yard pass from Barkley (Heidar kick)
 
Fourth Quarter scoring: USC – Woods 41-yard pass from Barkley (Heidari kick)

Oregon (Pac-12 Conference Championship)

Head coach Rick Neuheisel coached his final game for the Bruins.

First Quarter scoring: ORE – LaMichael James 30-yard run (Alejandro Maldonado kick); UCLA – Patrick Larimore 35-yard interception return (Tyler Gonzalez kick); ORE – Darron Thomas 10-yard run (Maldonado kick); ORE – Colt Lyerla 7-yard pass from Thomas, Darron (Maldonado kick)
  
Second Quarter scoring:  UCLA – Nelson Rosario 37-yard pass from Kevin Prince (Gonzalez kick); ORE – James 3-yard run (Maldonado kick); ORE – Daryle Hawkins 25-yard pass from Thomas (Maldonado kick); UCLA – Gonzalez 44-yard field goal
 
Third Quarter scoring: UCLA – Prince 1-yard run (Gonzalez kick); ORE – James 5-yard run (Maldonado kick); ORE – David Paulson 22-yard pass from Thomas (Maldonado kick)
  
Fourth Quarter scoring: UCLA – Nelson Rosario 19-yard pass from Prince (Gonzalez kick)

Illinois (Kraft Fight Hunger Bowl)

Despite a losing record, the Bruins (6–7) were granted a waiver to play in a bowl game by the NCAA on November 30, 2011, after the Pac-12 conference did not have enough eligible teams to fill its bowl commitments. The Bruins were coached by interim head coach Mike Johnson, who replaced Rick Neuheisel, while the Fighting Illini were coached by interim head coach Vic Koenning, replacing Ron Zook.

First Quarter scoring: No score

Second Quarter scoring: UCLA – Taylor Embree 16-yard pass from Kevin Prince (Tyler Gonzalez kick); ILL – Derek Dimke 36-yard field goal
 
Third Quarter scoring: ILL – T. Hawthorne 39-yard interception return (Dimke kick) 
 
Fourth Quarter scoring: ILL – Dimke 37-yard field goal; ILL – A. J. Jenkins 60-yard pass from N. Scheelhaase (Dimke kick); UCLA – Nelson Rosario 38-yard pass from Prince (Gonzalez kick),

Coaches

Rick Neuheisel – Head coach
Joe Tresey –  Defensive coordinator
Mike Johnson – Offensive coordinator
Inoke Breckterfield – Defensive line
Tim Hundley – Secondary
 Jim Mastro – Tight ends/F-Backs
 Clark Lea – Linebackers
 Angus McClure, Special teams
Wayne Moses – Running backs
Bob Palcic – Offensive line
 Marcus Patton – Graduate assistant/Defense

Notes
 August 8–20, 2011 – Public pre-season football practices begin on August 8, 2011, and end with a scrimmage at Drake Stadium on August 20, 2011.
 October 31, 2011 – Safety Tevin McDonald was named Bank of the West Pac-12 Defensive Player-of-the-Week.
 November 17, 2011 – Running back Malcolm Jones was selected to the 2011 Pac-12 Conference All-Academic first team, and sophomore F-back Anthony Barr and junior punter Jeff Locke to the second team.
 November 28, 2011 – Coach Rick Neuheisel was relieved of his duties three days after the 50–0 loss to rival USC. He was allowed to coach his final game at the December 2 Pac-12 Conference football Championship game. Offensive Coordinator Mike Johnson will serve as interim head coach at a bowl game.
December 6, 2011 – UCLA becomes the first bowl-eligible team to lose a total of eight games in a season.
 December 10, 2011 – Jim L. Mora was named new head coach of the Bruins.

References

UCLA
UCLA Bruins football seasons
UCLA Bruins football